Dipak Karki is a Nepalese politician, belonging to the Communist Party of Nepal (UML). In April 2008, he won the Jhapa-6 seat in the Constituent Assembly election with 14196 votes.

References

Year of birth missing (living people)
Living people
Communist Party of Nepal (Unified Marxist–Leninist) politicians

Members of the 1st Nepalese Constituent Assembly